Mark 7 "Thor" (or Mk-7') was the first tactical fission bomb adopted by US armed forces. It was also the first weapon to be delivered using the toss method with the help of the low-altitude bombing system (LABS). The weapon was tested in Operation Buster-Jangle. To facilitate external carry by fighter-bomber aircraft, Mark 7 was fitted with retractable stabilizer fins. The Mark 7 warhead (W7) also formed the basis of the  BOAR rocket, the Mark 90 Betty nuclear depth charge, MGR-1 Honest John rocket, and MGM-5 Corporal ballistic missile.  It was also supplied for delivery by Royal Air Force Canberra aircraft assigned to NATO in Germany under the command of SACEUR. This was done under the auspices of Project E, an agreement between the United States and the UK on the RAF carriage of US nuclear weapons. In UK use it was designated 1,650 lb. H.E. M.C.
The Mark 7 was in service from 1952 to 1967(8) with 1700–1800 having been built.

Design

The Mark 7 was a variable yield fission weapon using a levitated pit and an implosion design using 92 high explosive lenses. The weapon had multiple yields of 8, 19, 22, 30, 31, and 61 kt by using different weapon pits. The weapon had both an airburst and contact fuzing modes. The weapon used in flight insertion for safing and later versions of the weapon used a PAL A type arming and safing system. Approximately 1700 to 1800 Mark 7 bombs and 1350 W7 warheads were produced.

It was fitted with one vertical retractable stabilizer fin that allowed it to fit better in or under some planes. This was unique, and made it one of the first nuclear weapons to be streamlined enough to be carried on smaller planes.

Delivery system
There were 10 different models of this warhead produced for several different delivery systems. Beside the Mark 7 bomb, this included the BOAR air-to-surface rocket, the MGR-1 Honest John and MGM-5 Corporal tactical surface-to-surface missiles, the Betty Mark 90 depth bomb, the MIM-14 Nike Hercules surface-to-air missile and an atomic demolition munition.

Configured as a Mark 7 gravity bomb and as the BOAR, the weapon was carried by the F-84 Thunderjet, F-100 Super Sabre and F-101 Voodoo fighter-bombers, and the B-57 Canberra bomber.

Tests
During Operation Teapot MET on 15 April 1955 a test was conducted using a Mk7 warhead using an experimental composite plutonium/uranium-233 pit, producing a 22kt yield, 33% lower than expected. As Shot MET was a military effects test the lower yield ruined many of the experiments being conducted by the DoD during the test. The DoD had not been informed of the substitution by Los Alamos.

T2 Atomic Demolition Munition

An Atomic Demolition Munition (ADM) called the T2 was considered starting in February 1953. Some work on the project was completed but the device was cancelled before production. The system was to have both command and timer detonation options.

Survivors
A Mark 7 casing is on display in the Cold War hangar at the National Museum of the United States Air Force in Dayton, Ohio, and one is on display at Wings over the Rockies Museum, Denver, Colorado.

Specifications 
 Length: 
 Diameter: 
 Weight: 
 Fuzing: airburst or contact
 Implosion nuclear weapon

Users 

 English Electric Canberra (Royal Air Force)
 Douglas F3D-2B Skyknight
 Douglas A-1 Skyraider
 Douglas A-3 Skywarrior
 Douglas A-4 Skyhawk
 Martin B-57 Canberra
 McDonnell F2H Banshee
 McDonnell F3H Demon
 McDonnell F-101 Voodoo
 North American FJ Fury
 North American B-45 Tornado
 North American F-100 Super Sabre
 Republic F-84 Thunderjet

See also
 RDS-4
 List of nuclear weapons

References

External links
SAC: Nuclear Weapons

Mark 07
Nuclear bombs of the United States
Military equipment introduced in the 1950s